Cecilia Comunales (born 4 December 1988 in Paysandú, Uruguay) is a boxer. She has a professional record of 14-1 and was named WBA women's lightweight champion of the world.

Early life
At age seven she won a beauty contest during the cosmopolitan city's annual "Beer Week", and has since been known as "La Reina", i.e. "The Queen". Initially inspired by the Clint Eastwood women's boxing movie "Million Dollar Baby", Comunales began her boxing training at age 16. She compiled a 14-4-2 record as an amateur, competing mostly in Argentina.
Before taking up contact sports, Comunales had practiced skating and gymnastics. She has said that her mother did not want her to get into boxing after she saw "Million Dollar Baby", so she first told her that she was training in gymnastics.

Professional career
Comunales made her professional debut on January 10, 2009 and quickly won her first 6 fights before losing in early 2010. Since that sole loss she has gone on to win her last 8 fights. On this run of wins she has picked up both the UBO and WBC lightweight titles. Apart from one fight in Panama in 2012 all of her fights have taken place in either Argentina or Uruguay.

Professional boxing record

References

1988 births
Sportspeople from Paysandú
World boxing champions
Living people
Uruguayan women boxers
World lightweight boxing champions